Gamal Abdel Chasten was born and raised on the Lower East Side of Manhattan, Gamal is a core member of Universes, a poetic theatre ensemble.

Theater credits
The Last Word
God took away his Poem
The Ride
Slanguage
Ameriville

Awards/affiliations
2008 Jazz at Lincoln Center Rhythm Road Tour;
Publications: UNIVERSES-THE BIG BANG (2010 release- TCG Books);

References

External links
Universes official site
Universes on Wikipedia

American male poets
21st-century American dramatists and playwrights
Writers from New York City
Living people
American male dramatists and playwrights
Poets from New York (state)
21st-century American poets
21st-century American male writers
Year of birth missing (living people)